= Tape delay =

Tape delay may refer to:

- Delay (audio effect), an audio effect reminiscent of an echo
- Broadcast delay, the practice of intentionally delaying a radio and television broadcast of live material
